Perficient, Inc. is a global digital consultancy. The company's efforts include enterprise mobile applications, creative services, marketing, digital strategy Internet of Things, information technology, management consulting, custom development, and platform implementations.

The firm primarily performs project-based work, a large portion of which involves business intelligence and portal collaboration. Perficient also has offshore capabilities.

Perficient has offices in North America, South America, Europe, India, and China.

History

Formation and early years 

The company was founded in Austin, Texas in August 1997 by Bryan Menell. The first angel investors in the company were Steve Papermaster and David Lundeen. The company secured its first channel partnership with Vignette, a provider of content management systems.

The company held its initial public offering (IPO) on July 29, 1999. In December 1999, the company completed its first acquisition of LoreData based in New London, Connecticut. In May 2000, Perficient acquired Compete, Inc.

In 2001, Vertecon Inc. was acquired.

Jack McDonald became CEO of Perficient in 1999 and chairman in 2001. McDonald served in both positions until 2009. Lori Hawkins of Statesman noted that during McDonald's tenure, Perficient "grew from eight employees to more than 1,200 worldwide and had annual sales of $200 million." According to the St. Louis Business Journal in August 2009, "during the second quarter, Perficient lost $196,000 on $44.9 million in revenue, compared with a $3.9 million profit on $59.1 million in revenue during the same period last year" (in 2008).

Jeffrey Davis became Perficient's COO in 2001 and president in 2003. Davis was named CEO in September 2009.

During Davis' tenure as CEO, the firm transitioned from the Nasdaq SmallCap Market to the Nasdaq Global Select Market. By 2014, Davis had helped Perficient buy 13 companies in deals worth a combined $232.3 million since taking over as CEO in 2009.

In 2011, Perficient acquired business and management consulting firm Exervio for $13.6 million. In 2012, Perficient acquired PointBridge Solutions, LLC for $22 million. Perficient then acquired services and technology consulting firm Nascent Systems LP in July, 2012. Also in 2012, Perficient acquired Northridge Systems.

In 2013, Perficent acquired TriTek Solutions Inc., an IBM-focused enterprise content management and business process management consulting firm for $18.5 million. Perficient then acquired two salesforce.com firms, CoreMatrix Systems LLC and Clear Task, Inc.

In 2014, the company made three acquisitions: ForwardThink Group, BioPharm Systems, and the IBM Smarter Commerce Division of Trifecta Technologies. Perficient also announced that year its plans to open a domestic delivery center in Lafayette, Louisiana.

In 2015, Perficient acquired Market Street Solutions, Inc., an IT consulting firm. In December 2015, Perficient acquired Enlighten, a digital marketing agency.

In 2016, Perficient launched a new digital marketing agency called Perficient Digital. Over 200 Perficient employees work under the new Perficient Digital banner, with most of them in Ann Arbor, Michigan; Milwaukee; St. Louis; and Irvine, California.

In 2017, Perficient acquired RAS & Associates, LLC, a Denver-based management consultancy  In June 2017, Perficient acquired Clarity Consulting a Chicago-based consultancy where approximately 160 technology, sales, consulting, and general and administrative professionals were added, making it the largest acquisition to date.

In 2018, Perficient acquired Southport Services Group, LLC, a Washington D.C.-based MicroStrategy shop, offering analytics and data expertise. In July 2018, Perficient acquired Stone Temple Consulting, a Boston-based digital marketing agency founded by Eric Enge  rounding out Perficient's  overall engagement in the digital space and depth around search engine optimization. In October 2018, Perficient acquired Elixiter, Inc.

In 2018, Perficient's services revenue came in at $494 million, a year-over-year increase of 11%.

In May 2019, Perficient acquired Fargo, North Dakota-based Sundog Interactive, a firm that provides business-to-business marketing and Salesforce consulting to leading manufacturers.

In January 2020, Perficient acquired MedTouch LLC (“MedTouch”), an award-winning, $13 million annual revenue digital healthcare marketing and technology consultancy.

In March 2020, Perficient announced the acquisition of Catalyst Networks, Inc., a Georgia corporation doing business as Brainjocks (“Brainjocks US”), a $13 million annual revenue digital consultancy with a strong Sitecore platform focus.

In June 2020, Perficient  acquired Productora de Software S.A.S. (“PSL”), a $33 million annual revenue nearshore software development company, based in Medellin, Colombia, with additional locations in Bogota and Cali, Colombia.

In October 2021, Perficient acquired Overactive Inc, a $40 million annual revenue nearshore software development company, based in Uruguay with additional locations in Argentina, Chile, Colombia, Bolivia, Puerto Rico and USA.

In September 2022, Perficient acquired Inflection Point Systems, Inc. (“Inflection Point”), an approximately $15 million revenue software consulting and product development firm with nearshore operations based in Monterrey, Mexico, and headquarters in Columbia, Maryland.

In October 2022, Perficient acquired Ameex Technologies Corporation (“Ameex”), an approximately $19 million revenue digital experience consultancy headquartered in Schaumburg, IL, with offshore operations located in Chennai, India.

Acquisitions

Partners 
Microsoft 
Oracle
IBM
Salesforce 
In 2013, Perficient made two acquisitions related to Salesforce.com: New York City-based CoreMatrix Systems and San Francisco-based ClearTask. 
Adobe
Pivotal
Sitecore

== References ==

Companies listed on the Nasdaq